Dayton station is an island platformed RTD light rail station in Aurora, Colorado, United States. Operating as part of the H and R lines, the station was opened on November 17, 2006, and is operated by the Regional Transportation District.

References

RTD light rail stations
Transportation buildings and structures in Aurora, Colorado
Railway stations in the United States opened in 2006
2006 establishments in Colorado
Railway stations in highway medians